Minto is an unincorporated community recognized as a local urban district located in the Municipality of Grassland, Manitoba, Canada.

A railway point for the Canadian National railway and post office was located in Minto. It was named in 1899 for Sir Gilbert Elliot-Murray-Kynynmound, 4th Earl of Minto. He was the Governor General of Canada at the time.

Transportation 
These routes connect it to several other communities in the region, as well as the North Dakota border at the International Peace Garden and the Pembina Valley region of the province.

Popular Culture 
Minto was featured during season 4 of the CBC program Still Standing.

The episode originally aired on December 4, 2018.

References

External links
 Manitoba Municipal Profiles

Local urban districts in Manitoba
Unincorporated communities in Westman Region